Ping may refer to:

Arts and entertainment

Fictional characters
 Ping, a domesticated Chinese duck in the illustrated book The Story about Ping, first published in 1933
 Ping, a minor character in Seinfeld, an NBC sitcom
 Ping, a character in the webcomic Megatokyo
 Ping, the disguised identity of Hua Mulan in the animated film Mulan
 Ping the Elastic Man, a comic strip character introduced in The Beano in 1938
 "The machine that goes Ping!", a fictitious obstetric medical device featured in the film Monty Python's The Meaning of Life
 Mr. Ping, a character in the Kung Fu Panda franchise
 Professor Ping, a character in the film Barbarella
 Ping, a character in Carole Wilkinson's novel Dragonkeeper

Other uses in arts and entertainment
 "Ping" (short story), by Samuel Beckett
 Ping!, a 2000 film featuring Shirley Jones
 Ping.fm, a microblog social network
 Ping, an ability in the trading card game Magic: The Gathering

People

Names
 Ping (given name)
 Ping (surname) (平), a Chinese surname
 Bing (Chinese surname) (邴), romanized Ping in Wade–Giles

People with the nickname
 Frank Steven Ping Bodie (1887–1961), Major League Baseball player
 Panfilo Morena "Ping" Lacson (born 1948), Filipino politician and current member of the Philippine Senate

Places 
 Ping, Washington, a community in the United States
 Ping River, Thailand

Science and technology

Computing
 Ping (blogging), used for blogs, RSS, and related web services
 Ping (networking utility), a computer network monitoring tool 
 PING (PNG), graphics file format
 Ping (video games), the network latency between computers used in online gaming
 iTunes Ping, a social network for music that was once built into Apple iTunes

Other uses in science and technology
 Ping (unit), the Chinese equivalent of pyeong (坪), a Korean unit of area
 Ping, a pulse of sound in active sonar
 Ping project, a project of the European Molecular Biology network (EMBnet)
 Pinging, a noise indicative of improper combustion in internal combustion engines

Other uses
 Ping (golf), a manufacturer and brand name of golf equipment
 Bing (bread), also written as "ping", a type of Chinese flat bread
 "The Ping", a phenomenon present in the Fury and Hecla Strait

See also

 
 
 Pinge (surname) 
 Pinger (disambiguation)
 PNG (disambiguation)
 Bing (disambiguation)
 Ding (disambiguation)